Polyrock is Polyrock's eponymous debut album. It was first released in 1980 on LP on RCA Records. A CD version was not available until 2007, when it was reissued on Wounded Bird Records.

It was included at number 76 on Fact magazine's list of "The 100 Best Albums of the 1980s".

Track listing
All tracks written by Bill and Tom Robertson.

"Romantic Me" – 3:09
"Green for Go" – 3:40
"This Song" – 2:15
"Go West" – 3:22
"Your Dragging Feet" – 5:00
"No Love Lost" – 2:55
"Body Me" – 2:41
"Sound Alarm" – 3:01
"Bucket Rider" – 2:55
"Shut Your Face" – 2:13
"#7" – 2:56

Personnel
Billy Robertson – guitar, vocals
Tommy Robertson – guitar, electronics, violin
Curt Cosentino – bass machine, synthesizer
Lenny Aaron – keyboards
Joseph Yannece – drums, percussions
Philip Glass – piano, keyboards
Catherine Oblasney – percussions, vocals

Singles
 Romantic Me / Your Dragging Feet (1980) #69 [Club Play Singles]

References

1980 debut albums
Polyrock albums
RCA Records albums